Franz Chadbourne Eschweiler (September 6, 1863 – November 14, 1929) was an American lawyer and judge from Wisconsin.  He was a justice of the Wisconsin Supreme Court for the last 13 years of his life.

Biography

Born in Houghton, Michigan, Eschweiler studied at the University of Michigan and the University of Iowa. Eschweiler was admitted to the bar in Milwaukee, Wisconsin, in 1889, and practiced law, in Milwaukee. In 1910, he was elected a Wisconsin Circuit Court judge for the newly created 6th Branch of the Milwaukee County-based 2nd Circuit. In 1916, before the end of his 6 year term as judge, Eschweiler was elected to the Wisconsin Supreme Court, serving until his death in 1929.

Electoral history

Wisconsin Circuit Court (1910)

| colspan="6" style="text-align:center;background-color: #e9e9e9;"| General Election, April 1910

Wisconsin Supreme Court (1916, 1926)

| colspan="6" style="text-align:center;background-color: #e9e9e9;"| General Election, April 1916

| colspan="6" style="text-align:center;background-color: #e9e9e9;"| General Election, April 6, 1926

References

1863 births
1929 deaths
People from Houghton, Michigan
Lawyers from Milwaukee
University of Michigan alumni
Wisconsin state court judges
Justices of the Wisconsin Supreme Court
19th-century American lawyers